Eryx borrii is a species of snake in the family Boidae. The species is endemic to Somalia.

References 

borrii
Reptiles of Somalia
Reptiles described in 2005